Dharmavaram is a village in Guntur district of the Indian state of Andhra Pradesh. It is located in Durgi mandal of Narasaraopet revenue division.

See also 
List of villages in Guntur district

References

Villages in Guntur district